Zhangshu is a town under the administration of Yongxing County, in southeastern Hunan, China. , it has one residential community and 12 villages under its administration.

References 

Towns of Chenzhou
Yongxing County